Hammond Castle is located on the Atlantic coast in the Magnolia area of Gloucester, Massachusetts. The castle, which was constructed between 1926 and 1929, was the home, laboratory, and museum of John Hays Hammond, Jr., an inventor and pioneer in the study of remote control who held over four hundred patents. The building is composed of modern and 15th-, 16th-, and 18th-century architectural elements and sits on a rocky cliff overlooking Gloucester Harbor.

The castle operates as the Hammond Castle Museum, displaying Hammond's collection of Roman, medieval, and Renaissance artifacts as well as exhibits about his life and inventions. The Great Hall contains a large pipe organ which has been used for concerts and recordings by organists including Richard Ellsasser and Virgil Fox as well as many other well known artists of the time. The instrument was built by Hammond starting in the early 1920s before the castle was built. It was subsequently moved to the castle upon the castle’s completion and had multiple stages of major changes across the years. Most notably, in the 1940s, 1950s, 1970s, and 1980s. As of 2004, the organ is no longer functional.

History and development
John Hays Hammond Jr. engaged the Boston, Massachusetts architectural firm of Allen & Collens in 1923 to design Hammond's dream residence, a medieval style castle. The original castle was to be a tower house built on his father's Lookout Hill compound. Hammond's close friend, Leslie Buswell, who would soon begin construction on his own nearby home, Stillington Hall, told Hammond he was trying to recreate Chartres Cathedral, almost matching the 121' high nave of the cathedral. In 1924, Hammond called for a more modest redesign which would reduce the height of the structure from 120' to 87' and a footprint of 43' by 30', but maintain the tower house style. After being ordered from the Lookout Hill property by his parents, Hammond moved to purchase a new site a mile to the south near Norman's Woe Reef. A complete redesign was developed which resulted in a shorter castle (81') but larger footprint (142' by 70').

Gallery

See also
National Register of Historic Places listings in Gloucester, Massachusetts
National Register of Historic Places listings in Essex County, Massachusetts

References

 American Castles, by Julian Cavalier, published 1973, pages 15–287.

External links

John Hays Hammond, Jr. and His Castle Museum
The Infography of John Hays Hammond, Jr.
Hammond Castle Museum official site
The History of Hammond Castle

Houses in Gloucester, Massachusetts
Castles in Massachusetts
Castles in the United States
Historic house museums in Massachusetts
Museums in Essex County, Massachusetts
Biographical museums in Massachusetts
Museums established in 1930
History museums in Massachusetts
Houses on the National Register of Historic Places in Essex County, Massachusetts